Route 6, or Highway 6, may refer to routes in the following countries:

International
  Asian Highway 6
  European route E6 
  European route E006

Albania 
  National Road SH6

Argentina
  Buenos Aires Provincial Route 6

Australia

New South Wales
  A6 (Sydney)

Queensland
  Logan Motorway
  Flinders Highway, Queensland

Tasmania
  Huon Highway

Proposals
  F6 Extension (Proposed)

Austria
  Nordost Autobahn

Bolivia
  Route 6 (Bolivia)

Bulgaria
  A6 motorway (Bulgaria)
  I-6 road (Bulgaria)

Cambodia
 National Highway 6 (Cambodia)

Canada
  Alberta Highway 6
  British Columbia Highway 6
  Manitoba Highway 6
 New Brunswick Route 6 (1927–1965)
 New Brunswick Route 6 (1965–1984)
  Northwest Territories Highway 6
  Nova Scotia Trunk 6
  Ontario Highway 6
  Prince Edward Island Route 6
  Quebec Route 6 (former)
  Saskatchewan Highway 6
  Yukon Highway 6 (Canol Road)

China
  G6 Expressway

Costa Rica
  National Route 6

Czech Republic
  D6 Motorway
  I/6 Highway (in Czech)

Djibouti
  RN-6 (Djibouti)

Dominican Republic
  DR-6

Germany
  Bundesautobahn 6

Hong Kong
  Route 6 (Hong Kong)

Hungary
  M6 motorway (Hungary)
  Main road 6 (Hungary)

India
  National Highway 6 (India)

Indonesia
  Indonesian National Route 6

Iran
  Freeway 6 (Iran)

Iraq
  Highway 6 (Iraq)

Ireland
  M6 motorway (Republic of Ireland)
  N6 road (Ireland)

Israel
  Highway 6 (Israel)

Italy
 Autostrada A6
 RA 6

Japan
 
 
 
 
 
  Route 6 (Nagoya Expressway)

Korea, South
  National Route 6

Malaysia
  Malaysia Federal Route 6

New Zealand
  New Zealand State Highway 6

Paraguay
 National Route 6

Philippines
  Circumferential Road 2
  Radial Road 6
  N6 highway (Philippines)
  E6 expressway (Philippines)

Romania
  Drumul Naţional 6
  A6 motorway (Romania)

Russia
  M6 highway (Russia)

Taiwan
  National freeway 6

Ukraine
  Highway M06 (Ukraine)

United Kingdom
  M6 motorway
  M6 Toll
  A6 road (England)
  A6 road (Isle of Man)
  A6 road (Northern Ireland)

United States
  U.S. Route 6
  U.S. Route 6N
  U.S. Route 6N (New York) (former)
  U.S. Route 6N (Pennsylvania 1931-1935) (former)
  New England Interstate Route 6 (former)
  New England Route 6B
  Alabama State Route 6 (former)
  Alaska Route 6
  Arkansas Highway 6 (former)
  California State Route 6 (former)
  Delaware Route 6
  Florida State Road 6
  County Road 6 (Columbia County, Florida)
  Georgia State Route 6
  Idaho State Highway 6
  Illinois Route 6
  Indiana State Road 6 (former)
  K-6 (Kansas highway)
  Kentucky Route 6
  Louisiana Highway 6
  Louisiana State Route 6 (former)
  Maine State Route 6
  Maryland Route 6
  M-6 (Michigan highway)
  Minnesota State Highway 6
  County Road 6 (Dakota County, Minnesota)
  County Road 6 (Goodhue County, Minnesota)
  County Road 6 (Hennepin County, Minnesota)
  County Road 6 (Ramsey County, Minnesota)
  County Road 6 (St. Louis County, Minnesota)
  County Road 6 (Washington County, Minnesota)
  Mississippi Highway 6
  Missouri Route 6
  Nevada State Route 6 (former)
  Nevada State Route 6B (former)
  Nevada State Route 6C (former)
  New Jersey Route 6 (former)
  County Route 6 (Monmouth County, New Jersey)
  County Route 6B (Monmouth County, New Jersey)
  New Mexico State Road 6
 New York State Route 6 (1924–1927) (former)
  County Route 6 (Albany County, New York)
  County Route 6 (Allegany County, New York)
  County Route 6 (Cattaraugus County, New York)
  County Route 6 (Chautauqua County, New York)
  County Route 6 (Chenango County, New York)
  County Route 6 (Dutchess County, New York)
  County Route 6 (Erie County, New York)
  County Route 6 (Franklin County, New York)
  County Route 6 (Genesee County, New York)
  County Route 6 (Greene County, New York)
  County Route 6 (Hamilton County, New York)
  County Route 6 (Jefferson County, New York)
  County Route 6 (Madison County, New York)
  County Route 6 (Niagara County, New York)
  County Route 6 (Oneida County, New York)
  County Route 6 (Ontario County, New York)
  County Route 6 (Orange County, New York)
  County Route 6 (Oswego County, New York)
  County Route 6 (Rensselaer County, New York)
  County Route 6 (Schoharie County, New York)
  County Route 6 (Schuyler County, New York)
  County Route 6 (St. Lawrence County, New York)
  County Route 6 (Steuben County, New York)
  County Route 6 (Suffolk County, New York)
  County Route 6 (Tioga County, New York)
  North Carolina Highway 6 (former)
  North Dakota Highway 6
  Ohio State Route 6 (1923-1927) (former)
  Ohio State Route 6 (1927) (former)
  Ohio State Route 6 (pre-1931) (former)
  Oklahoma State Highway 6
  Oregon Route 6
  Pennsylvania Route 6 (former)
  Rhode Island Route 6
  South Carolina Highway 6
  Tennessee State Route 6
  Texas State Highway 6
  Texas State Highway Loop 6 (former)
  Texas State Highway Spur 6
  Farm to Market Road 6
  Texas Park Road 6
  Texas Recreational Road 6
  Utah State Route 6
  Virginia State Route 6
  Washington State Route 6
  Washington State Highway 6 (former)
  West Virginia Route 6

Territories
  American Samoa Highway 006
  Guam Highway 6
  Puerto Rico Highway 6

Uruguay
  Route 6 Joaquín Suárez

See also
 List of A6 roads
 List of highways numbered 6A